5-Methoxy-alpha-ethyltryptamine (5-MeO-α-ET) is a psychoactive drug and member of the tryptamine chemical class. It produces psychedelic and stimulant effects.

Dosage
5-MeO-α-ET, when used recreationally, is usually taken orally at dosages of 50–75 mg.

Effects
5-MeO-α-ET produces entactogenic and stimulant effects that can last 4–6 hours. However, little information exists on the psychopharmacological effects of this compound, thus considerable variation with regard to dosage and effects can be expected.

Dangers
There have been no reported deaths or hospitalizations from 5-MeO-α-ET, but its safety profile is unknown.

Legality
5-MeO-α-ET is unscheduled and uncontrolled in the United States, but possession and sales of 5-MeO-α-ET could be prosecuted under the Federal Analog Act because of its structural similarities to α-ET and α-MT.

See also 
 4-HO-AMT
 4-Methyl-AET
 5-Fluoro-AET
 5-EtO-AMT
 5-MeO-AMT
 7-Methyl-AET
 alpha-Ethyltryptamine
 alpha-Methyltryptamine

References 

Psychedelic tryptamines
Designer drugs
Monoamine oxidase inhibitors
Serotonin-norepinephrine-dopamine releasing agents
Serotonin receptor agonists
Mexamines